Gwalior Junction railway station (station code: GWL) is the main railway station of Gwalior, Madhya Pradesh, India. It is operated by Indian Railways and is part of the Jhansi Division of the North-Central Railways.

Description
Gwalior Junction is one of the major commercial railway stations of the North Central Railway zone of Indian Railways, whose zonal headquarters are located in Allahabad. The station won awards from Indian Railways for clean infrastructure in 1987, 1988, 1989, and 1992. Express trains such as the Duronto Express, Bhopal Express, Taj Express, Rajdhani Express, Garib Rath Express, Bhopal Shatabdi, and the Gatimaan Express—which was the fastest train in India until 2019—as well as 165 other trains, all stop at Gwalior Junction. 11 trains originate from Gwalior Junction.

Gwalior Junction is served by a Narrow-gauge route where trains operation are closed in 2020. The Gwalior narrow-gauge track is the narrowest in India.

Redevelopment

The Gwalior Junction railway station has been proposed to be redeveloped at a cost of approximately  240 crores under the station redevelopment program by the Indian Railway Stations Development Corporation Ltd (IRSDC). It is one among the four new railway stations which had been finalized for redevelopment based on the public-private partnership (PPP) model. According to IRSDC, the in-principle approval for inviting the request for quotation (RFQ) for the redevelopment of the railway station based on the PPP model was granted by the Public-Private Partnership Appraisal Committee (PPPAC) on 20 December 2019.

Connectivity
Gwalior Junction is well-connected to all parts of the country via train like New Delhi, Mumbai, Vijayawada, Bhopal, Jabalpur, Lucknow, Chennai, Bangalore, Hyderabad, Pune, Kolkata, Jammu, Agra, Puri, Bhubaneswar, Ahmedabad, Amritsar, Dehradun, and Thiruvananthapuram.

Gwalior Junction is served by four broad-gauge routes:
To Agra–New Delhi
To Jhansi–Bhopal
To Guna–Ujjain
To Gwalior Birlanagar–Bhind–Etawah

Gwalior Junction is served by a narrow-gauge route called Gwalior Light Railway. 
 To Sabalgarh–Sheopur

References

External links

Jhansi railway division
Railway junction stations in Madhya Pradesh
Railway stations in Gwalior
Year of establishment missing